The  is an archaeological site containing the ruins of a large-scale Yayoi period settlement with an associated shell midden located in what is now part of the city of Kiyosu, Aichi in the Tōkai region of Japan.  The shell midden was designated a National Historic Site of Japan in 1971.

Overview
The Kaigarayama Shell Midden is associated with the neighboring Asahi village ruins, which is located 20 minutes on foot from Shin-Kiyosu Station on the Meitetsu Nagoya Main Line. The midden has a diameter of 15 meters and a depth of 2.5 meters. The site is in a low-lying alluvial area of the Kiso River, with an elevation of five meters above the modern sea level, at the northern end of the Nōbi Plain.

The lowest layer of the midden dates from the final stages of the Jōmon period and the upper strata is from the early Kofun period, so the midden spans the whole of the Yayoi period. Along with the usual clam shells and fish and animal bones, the midden was found to contain many examples of stone tools and Yayoi pottery. The presence of early Yayoi pottery typical of the Onga River of western Japan, and streak-type Jōmon pottery shards typically from eastern Japan together in the same strata indicate that both cultures co-existed for a time in the same settlement. The midden was discovered in 1929, and was excavated in 1972 due to construction of an interchange junction on Japan National Route 302. It is the largest of several middens in the area.

The Asahi village ruins are one of the largest Yayoi period settlement ruins in Japan, and extended for 1.4 kilometers east-to-west by 0.8 kilometers north-to-south and had an estimated population of over 1000 people. It was a moated settlement, and was accompanied by a number of square burial tumuli.

In 1975, a prefectural museum, the  opened in a corner of the site, where some of the excavated artifacts are displayed.

See also
List of Historic Sites of Japan (Aichi)

References

External links
Aichi Asahi Site Museum 
Aichi Cultural Properties Navi 
Kaigarayama Shell Midden Exchange Center home page 

Yayoi period
History of Aichi Prefecture
Kiyosu, Aichi
Archaeological sites in Japan
Historic Sites of Japan
Shell middens in Japan